Jusif Joose Ali (born 4 May 2000) is a Finnish professional footballer who plays for HIFK, as a midfielder.

Career
Ali spent his early career with Klubi 04, FC Ilves and JJK. In August 2018, 18-year old Ali moved on loan to Dinamo Zagreb with an option to buy.

Ali then went on a one-week trial at Slovenian club NK Aluminij, before Cypriot club Pafos FC offered him a contract. He joined the club in September 2019 and was registered for the club's U21 squad. Ali scored five goals in 18 games for the youth teams of the club.

Ali returned to Finland and on 6 September 2020, he signed with Ykkönen club AC Oulu.

On 18 January 2021, Ali signed for HIFK.

References

External links
Jusif Ali 2019-20 stats at CFA

2000 births
Living people
Finnish footballers
Klubi 04 players
FC Ilves players
JJK Jyväskylä players
GNK Dinamo Zagreb players
Pafos FC players
AC Oulu players
Veikkausliiga players
Ykkönen players
Kakkonen players
Association football midfielders
Finnish expatriate footballers
Finnish expatriate sportspeople in Croatia
Finnish expatriate sportspeople in Cyprus
Expatriate footballers in Croatia
Expatriate footballers in Cyprus
HIFK Fotboll players
Footballers from Espoo